Matthias Fahrig (born 15 December 1985) is a German gymnast. He competed at the 2004 Summer Olympics in all artistic gymnastics events except for the rings and pommel horse and finished in eighth place with the German team. His best individual results were 32nd place on the horizontal bar and in the floor exercise.

He won two gold, two silver and two bronze medals in the vault, floor and team competitions at the European championships in 2007, 2009 and 2010, as well as a team bronze at the 2010 World Artistic Gymnastics Championships.

References

1985 births
Living people
German male artistic gymnasts
Gymnasts at the 2004 Summer Olympics
Olympic gymnasts of Germany
Medalists at the World Artistic Gymnastics Championships
European champions in gymnastics
20th-century German people
21st-century German people